Rennie Harrison was a professional footballer who played once for Huddersfield Town in the Football League in the 1919–20 season. He played as a defender.

Harrison was born in 1897 in Burnley, and retired from football in October 1920.

References

English footballers
Association football defenders
English Football League players
Huddersfield Town A.F.C. players
1897 births
Year of death missing
Footballers from Burnley
Place of death missing